Samakhushi is an urban city in Nepal located within Kathmandu. It is roughly 10 minutes from Golkopakha, Thamel. Samakhushi has various guesthouses and offers a vibrant ethnic cultural taste.

Samakhushi is one of the cities within Kathmandu which is viewed as a peaceful area. Samakhushi neighbouring cities are Ranibari in East, Gangabu in North, Balaju in west and Golkopakha(towards Thamel) in south. Samakhushi has always been a commuting road for people from Tokha, Nuwakot, Jhor, Kakani to go centre of Kathamndu, Kastamandap.

Samakhusi is approximately 15 minutes drive from Bus Park from where there are services to major towns and cities in Nepal. It is the developing city of ktm. It is one of the developed city of Kathmandu.We can reach to famous nearby hospitals  from samakhushi like Green City and Grandy hospital.

Neighbourhoods in Kathmandu